An evaporating gas globule or EGG is a region of hydrogen gas in outer space approximately 100 astronomical units in size, such that gases shaded by it are shielded from ionizing UV rays.  Dense areas of gas shielded by an evaporating gas globule can be conducive to the birth of stars. Evaporating gas globules were first conclusively identified via photographs of the Pillars of Creation in the Eagle Nebula taken by the Hubble Space Telescope in 1995.

EGG's are the likely predecessors of new protostars. Inside an EGG the gas and dust are denser than in the surrounding dust cloud. Gravity  pulls the cloud  even more tightly together as the EGG continues to draw in material from its  surroundings. As the cloud  density builds up the globule becomes hotter under the weight of the outer layers, a protostar is formed inside the EGG.

A protostar may have  too little mass to become a star. If so it becomes a brown dwarf. If the protostar has sufficient mass, the density reaches a critical level where the temperature exceeds 10 million kelvin at its center. At this point, a nuclear reaction starts converting hydrogen to helium and releasing large amounts of energy. The protostar then becomes a star and joins the main sequence on the HR diagram.

A study of 73 EGGs in the Pillars of Creation (Eagle Nebula) with the Very Large Telescope showed that only 15% of the EGGs show signs of star-formation. The star-formation is not everywhere the same: The largest pillar has a small cluster of these sources at the head of the pillar.

References

External links
 Hubble sees stars and a stripe in celestial fireworks — ESA/NASA Image, July 1, 2008
 Embryonic Stars Emerge from Interstellar "Eggs", HubbleSite, Nov. 2, 1995 
 Hubble site
http://apod.nasa.gov/apod/image/1207/pillars6_hst_1518.jpg NASA.gov] NASA APODly 2012
NBC News Space,   3/5/2007

Nebulae
Cosmic dust
Molecular clouds